Clarence William Kolb (July 31, 1874 – November 25, 1964) was an American vaudeville performer and actor known for his comedy routines that featured a Dutch dialect.

Biography
Kolb started out as one half of a vaudeville comedy team, Kolb and Dill, with Max Dill. They styled their act on the famous team of Weber and Fields. In addition to their stage work, they appeared in a series of short films and a feature-length movie in 1917. Afterwards, Kolb made a return to vaudeville, only returning to the movies in the late 1930s.

In 1935, Kolb left the act to work in films as a character actor, eventually appearing in 75  feature films. He became famous for portraying the same type of character in many films, namely, a politician or businessman. He is best remembered for his roles as the grumpy father in the multi-Academy Award-nominated hit comedy film Merrily We Live (1938), as the corrupt mayor in the comedy His Girl Friday (1940), and as Mr. Honeywell in the television sitcom My Little Margie (1952). Kolb played himself in his last movie appearance, Man of a Thousand Faces (1957), opposite Danny Beck (who played the late Max Dill).

On September 1, 1917, Kolb married dancer May Cloy (whose birth name was Mabel S. Larsen). They were still married when he died.

Kolb died at age 90 of a stroke at the Orchard Gables Sanitarium in Hollywood. He is interred in the Forest Lawn Memorial Park Cemetery in Glendale, California.

Partial filmography

A Million for Mary (1916) - Louie 
The Three Pals (1916) - Louie
Bluff (1916) - Louie 
Peck o' Pickles (1916) - Rudolph Schlitz
Lonesome Town (1916) - Louie 
Glory (1917) - Louie Bohn
Beloved Rogues (1917) - Louie Vandergriff 
Two Flaming Youths (1927) - Kolb - as Kolb and Dill 
Fury (1936) - Durkin's Friend (uncredited)
After the Thin Man (1936) - Cousin Lucius (uncredited)
Maid of Salem (1937) - Town Crier (uncredited)
The Toast of New York (1937) - Cornelius Vanderbilt
Portia on Trial (1937) - John Condon
Wells Fargo (1937) - John Butterfield
Gold Is Where You Find It (1938) - Senator Walsh
Merrily We Live (1938) - Mr. Kilbourne
Give Me a Sailor (1938) - CaptainTallant
Carefree (1938) - Judge Travers
The Law West of Tombstone (1938) - Sam Kent
Honolulu (1939) - Mr. Horace Grayson
I Was a Convict (1939) - John B. Harrison
Society Lawyer (1939) - Mr. Leonard
It Could Happen to You (1939) - Alfred Wiman
Good Girls Go to Paris (1939) - Ted Dayton Sr.
Five Little Peppers and How They Grew (1939) - Mr. King
Our Leading Citizen (1939) - Jim Hanna
 Beware Spooks! (1939) - Commissioner Lester Lewis
The Amazing Mr. Williams (1939) - Police Captain McGovern
His Girl Friday (1940) - Mayor
Five Little Peppers at Home (1940) - Mr. King
The Man Who Talked Too Much (1940) - E.A. Smith
No Time for Comedy (1940) - Richard Benson
Tugboat Annie Sails Again (1940) - J.B. Armstrong
Michael Shayne, Private Detective (1940) - Brighton
Caught in the Draft (1941) - Col. Peter Fairbanks
Blossoms in the Dust (1941) - Texas Senator T.R. Cotton (uncredited)
Nothing But The Truth (1941) - Mr. Van Dusen
The Night of January 16th (1941) - Tilton
Bedtime Story (1941) - Collins
You're in the Army Now (1941) - General Winthrop
Hellzapoppin' (1941) - Andrew Rand
True to the Army (1942) - Gen. Marlowe
The Sky's the Limit (1943) - Harvey J. Sloan (uncredited)
The Falcon in Danger (1943) - Stanley Harris Palmer
True to Life (1943) - Mr. Huggins
Standing Room Only (1944) - Glen Ritchie
Irish Eyes Are Smiling (1944) - Leo Betz
Something for the Boys (1944) - Colonel Grubbs (uncredited)
Three Is a Family (1944) - Mr. Steele
What a Blonde (1945) - Charles DaFoe
Road to Alcatraz (1945) - Philip Angreet
The Kid from Brooklyn (1946) - Mr. Austin
White Tie and Tails (1946) - Mr. Arkwright
The Pilgrim Lady (1947) - Prof. Rankin
Lost Honeymoon (1947) - Mr. Evans
Fun on a Weekend (1947) - Quigley Quackenbush
The Hal Roach Comedy Carnival (1947) - Cornelius Belmont Sr., in 'Fabulous Joe'
The Fabulous Joe (1947) - Cornelius Belmont, II
Blondie in the Dough (1947) - J.T. Thorpe
Christmas Eve (1947) - Judge Alston
Impact (1949) - Darcy
Adam's Rib (1949) - Judge Reiser
The Rose Bowl Story (1952) - 'Gramps' Burke
Shake, Rattle & Rock! (1956) - Judge McCombs
Man of a Thousand Faces (1957) - Clarence Kolb (final film role)

References

External links
 

1874 births
1964 deaths
American male film actors
Vaudeville performers
Burials at Forest Lawn Memorial Park (Glendale)
American people of Austrian descent
20th-century American male actors
Male actors from Cleveland
American male television actors
20th-century comedians